Monika Rubin (born 20 December 1987) is a Danish politician and Member of the Folketing for Copenhagen from the Moderates. Alongside sixteen other members of The Moderates, Rubin was elected to the Folketing in November 2022.

References

See also 

 List of members of the Folketing, 2022–present

1987 births
Living people
Women members of the Folketing
21st-century Danish politicians
21st-century Danish women politicians
Members of the Folketing 2022–2026
Moderates (Denmark) politicians